Dinosaucers is a 1987 animated television series co-produced in the United States and Canada, produced by DIC Animation City and distributed in syndication in the US by Coca-Cola Telecommunications. The show was created by producer Michael E. Uslan, who considered it a "harebrained idea". A total of 65 episodes were made for the show's first-run syndication, but it only lasted one season.

There were originally plans by Galoob to release a Dinosaucers toyline, and prototype figures were produced. The toyline were to include the characters Stego, Bronto-Thunder, Allo, Bonehead, Plesio, Quackpot, Ankylo, and Genghis Rex. However, the line was scrapped when the show was canceled after airing its initial 65 episode run due to low viewership and poor reception. As a result, some markets began pulling the series from their cartoon line-ups instead of re-running the show's episodes for the remainder of the full 1987-1988 television season.

In 1989, after Dinosaucers premiered in Brazil, a company named Glasslite contacted Galoob and purchased the molds.  As such, Glasslite produced 5 of the 8 unproduced Galoob molds of the 8" figures although they can be extremely hard to find.

In 2018, Uslan joined with publisher Lion Forge Comics to revive Dinosaucers as a comic book. The 5-part mini-series however was left on a cliff hanger when the comic book was discontinued after a trade paperback was published in January 2019.

Description

The show follows the Dinosaucers and their battles against the evil Tyrannos. Each group is composed of intelligent anthropomorphic dinosaurs or other prehistoric saurian species. The Dinosaucers are also allied with four humans known as the Secret Scouts. The two groups originally come from a planet in a counter-Earth orbit known as Reptilon. Most of the characters are named after the type of prehistoric animal they are based on, or some pun of the name.

Both groups have a central base of operations. The Dinosaucers' base is called Lava Dome and is located in a mountain area, in a dormant volcano. The Tyrannos' base is located under a tar pit, which is next to an abandoned amusement park. Each of the groups' members save for Teryx and Terrible Dactyl–who can themselves fly–have flying ships in which they can travel and do battle. Most ships actually resemble the personae of their respective owners. Along with their individual ships, both groups have a large mothership of sorts as well.

Dinovolving
All the Dinosaucers have a button on the front of their uniforms which instantly devolves them to their primitive ancestors dinosaur state, while retaining their intelligence and speech capacity. This special ability is called Dinovolving and initially appeared to be a significant element of the series, as both Allo and Bronto Thunder Dinovolved in the first episode. Despite the apparent technological advantage, most of the later episodes did not feature any Dinovolving. Teryx was the only Dinosaucer who would never Dinovolve throughout the series, while Allo, Tricero, Bonehead and Bronto Thunder would use the ability in more than one episode.

The Tyrannos don't have the secret of Dinovolving, and a few episodes even revolve around their plans to steal the technology somehow. However, they do possess a special raygun called a devolver. Blasting a living creature with this weapon has the same "devolving" effect as Dinovolving, but reduces the victim's intelligence to that of the devolved form. For those from Reptilon the form is that of a normal dinosaur while humans get reverted to primitive cavemen. In any case, the device often winds up being used against them, to much comedic effect, rather than on the Dinosaucers. In this fashion, Genghis Rex, Ankylo, Quackpot and Brachio were all changed into primitive dinosaurs at various times in the series. The Tyrannos also possess a weapon called a "fossilizer", which is capable of turning its target into stone, as well as reversing the condition. The Dinosaucers were also shown to have access to this particular type of weapon in one episode, though it may have been on loan from the Tyrannos, as both factions had united to battle a group of anthropomorphic Sabertooth Tigers, who also hailed from Reptilon. These creatures possessed fossilizers as well, and also had a device which could disrupt the equivalent weapons belonging to the Dinosaucers and Tyrannos while leaving their own in perfect working order.

Characters

Dinosaucers
Allo is an evolved Allosaurus and the leader of the Dinosaucers. Allo is calm, collected and serious. He wears blue and teal armor, a teal helmet, and goes barefooted and has brown skin. He has a wife named Vera, a daughter named Alloetta and even a maid named Gatormaid (a play on Gatorade). He is the nephew of the Dinosorceror and Dinosorceress (rulers of Reptilon). His address on Reptilon is "where Palmer Avenue meets Emerson and Lake". He can Dinovolve into a 40-foot Allosaurus.
Dimetro is another member of the Dinosaucers and Allo's assistant. Dimetro is the scientist/mechanic of the group. He wears brown and red armor, a blue mask on his head, has aqua green skin and speaks with a slight Scottish accent. Dimetro is an evolved Dimetrodon, which is a basal synapsid or proto-mammal, rather than a dinosaur. He can Dinovolve into a large Dimetrodon.
Bronto Thunder is an evolved Apatosaurus, despite his name suggesting he's a Brontosaurus. Bronto Thunder has a girlfriend back on Reptilon named Apatty Saurus, and was a "rep" for a ceramic tile shop before he became a Dinosaucer. Bronto Thunder's name is an example of a tautology, as "bronto" means "thunder" in Ancient Greek. Physically considered the strongest of the Dinosaucers. He can Dinovolve into an 80-foot Apatosaurus.
Stego is an evolved Stegosaurus and a rather dim-witted recruit when compared to the rest of the team. He tries to be brave, but is prone to panic attacks and general cowardice. However, he often manages to get through this and has come to the rescue of his friends, particularly in the episode Trouble in Paradise. Stego can pull his head inside his Dinosaucers' uniform, much like a turtle. Stego also has an armored space ship similar to his race of Stegosaurs. Stego is a very powerful hand-to-hand combatant who doesn't realize his own strength. He can Dinovolve into a 30-foot Stegosaurus, though he was never seen doing so in the series.
Tricero is an evolved Triceratops. He had a history for doing investigative work back on Reptilon, and provides a voice of calm reason. Tricero was a member of the law-enforcing Tricerocops on Reptilon before he became a Dinosaucer. Tricero has a vibrational super power that emanates from his 2 brow horns. He is a mortal enemy to Styraco. He can Dinovolve into a 30-foot Triceratops.
Bonehead is Allo's nephew and, as his name suggests, is not particularly bright. However, he sometimes does display intelligence though in a mostly literal way. He has a baby brother named Numbskull (Nummy). Mother Bonehilda is a famous scientist, and Allo's sister. Bonehead is an evolved Pachycephalosaurus. He is good natured and innocent, without a doubt the stupidest Dinosaucer, even though he has great combat ability as a Pachycephalosaurus. He can Dinovolve into a 25-foot Pachycephalosaurus.
Ichy, whose name is pronounced "Icky", is an evolved Ichthyosaurus, a prehistoric aquatic reptile. He has a pointed beak, a tail with fins or flukes, grey skin and wears green armor. He also wears dark green flippers on his feet, rather than boots. Ichy (and Plesio) can talk to sea creatures. Throughout the series, though oblivious at first of her mutuality, he forms a couple with Teryx since the episode For the Love of Teryx. This is heavily implied because since then his love is reciprocal and he becomes very distressed when Teryx is approached by Genghis Rex, who also possess feelings for her, though these are not corresponded. He can Dinovolve into a 30-foot Ichthyosaurus.
Teryx is the only female Dinosaucer. She is an evolved Archaeopteryx, which is a derived theropod dinosaur, considered to be the first "true" bird. She is therefore either half-bird, half-reptile or an avian reptile. She has white, blue, and salmon-colored plumage and unlike the other Dinosaucers, wears a simple backpack in lieu of armor. She can understand and talk to birds. Teryx has a crush on Ichy, but fears it won't work out because she is a flying creature, while Ichy is aquatic, though she comes around it and gains confidence in herself as the series progresses, even forming a pair with Ichy since the episode For the Love of Teryx. At the same time, Teryx completely denies Genghis Rex's advances. Despite doing so, she understands him and despite stating she has no feelings for Rex in the episode Scales of Justice, she does seem to feel pity towards him. However, her feminine charms have been used against Genghis Rex, since his affection for her prevents him from harming her or even plotting against the Dinosaucers at times. Teryx used to be an actress on Reptilon's daytime television before she became a Dinosaucer. She can Dinovolve into a large Archaeopteryx, though she is never shown doing so during the course of the series. Teryx was turned into a human during the episode Cindersaurus, as the group had developed a technology called the Dinotransformatter that would allow them to transform into humans— ironically created seemingly for sole the purpose of allowing Teryx to attend a masquerade ball with Sara due to her having developed an interest in human courting rituals— and briefly had an attraction to a human at Sara's school named Douglas. Returned to normal by the episode's end, the character has since had no romantic interest in humans and the plot point of the Dinosaucers having a technology that would allow them to take on human form was forgotten. Presumably, they still possess the device, but it has become a forgotten piece of their arsenal. This episode was aired after the episode For the Love of Teryx, but may take place before it chronologically, as Teryx did seem to have a genuine attraction to Douglas, something which would contradict the fact of her relationship with Ichy, established fifteen episodes prior, barring an off-screen breakup that may not have been mentioned. Alternatively, her attraction may have been caused by the alteration from Dinosaucer to human, though if this is so, it may have some lingering effect, as Teryx is shown at the end of the episode to still find the time spent with Douglas to be apparently a brief period of genuine romance.

Secret Scouts
The Secret Scouts are four teenage humans who help the Dinosaucers as allies.  According to the opening credits they met them when they first arrived and gained powers through magic rings they were given.  They are some of the closest friends the Dinosaucers have while they are on Earth.

Ryan Spencer is a blond haired boy who is apparently the smartest and most athletic of the group; this, in the while, implies that he is the leader of the Scouts. He doesn't seem to get into as much trouble as his three friends do. 
Sara Spencer is a blond haired girl and Ryan’s younger sister. She is quite athletic and informative, often teaching the Dinosaucers (albeit confusing to them) Earth-related notions. With her ring power, she can strongly boost her physical abilities a little more than that of an Olympic athlete, allowing her to jump at amazing heights, run faster, and be more agile. She has a pet cat named Missy. She often goes on adventures with Bronto Thunder and relates very well to the only female Dinosaucer, Teryx. 
Paul (surname unknown/not given) is a smart bespectacled African-American boy. He seems to find the Dinosaucers thrilling and fun. He also has a pet dog named Charlie, who sometimes causes a lot of trouble for the Dinosaucers in various episodes. His Scout ring lets him run at enhanced speed over long distances. He generally spends a lot of time with Dimetro.
David (surname unknown/not given) is a black haired boy and the wild one of the Scouts. He often gets into trouble and making matters worse by getting the Dinosaucers involved in his "act-first and think-second" tactics. He is strong and athletic, and although he doesn't quite have the sharp intellect of Paul or Ryan, he is creative and a quick thinker. He is often involved with various adventures with Stego and Bonehead. His ring can increase his strength allowing him to lift objects weighing several hundred pounds.

Tyrannos

The Tyrannos are the forces of "evil" in the series and, like the Dinosaucers, have a total of 8 members in their group. The picture above does not show Princess Dei, as she does not appear at the presentation of the series and is only introduced later as a means to balance the difference in numbers and power of the two opposing factions.

During the course of the series, Plesio, Terrible Dactyl and Quackpot would all betray Genghis Rex at least once over matters of conscience. Nevertheless, they would eventually return to Rex's side out of loyalty to his cause.

Genghis Rex, usually referred to as simply "Rex", is the leader of the Tyrannos, as well as Allo's evil counterpart. He is an evolved Tyrannosaurus, has red skin and wears orange, blue armor and goes barefooted. His first name is based on Genghis Khan the famous Mongol. Living up to his species' reputation, he is brutal and tyrannical, and has a violent temper. He appears in every episode except for episode 13 (Trick or Cheat) and episode 59 (The Babysitter), in which Quackpot was the sole Tyranno to appear, and episode 35 (Fine-Feathered Friends) and episode 51 (Dinosaur Dundy), in which none of the Tyrannos appear. Typically, Rex will insult his compatriots with plays on dinosaur words or names, such as idiot-tops or tail-for-brains, whenever things do not go according to his plans. In exchange, Rex endures being called many flattering and important sounding names by the other Tyrannos, such as Bossasaur and Your Scaliness. A running gag throughout the series is that Rex strongly objects to the use of the term Chiefasaur when addressing him (a reference to the "don't call me 'Chief'" running gag of Perry White from the 50s Superman show). As a villain, he tends to be staggeringly inept, always losing to the Dinosaucers in the end. Genghis Rex has deep feelings for Teryx and even attempted to kidnap and marry her, but she resisted since she was in love with Ichy and objected to his ways. Rex also has an equally evil sister residing on Reptilon, named Princess Dei. Despite being evil, Rex does display respect and honor towards others at times and his relationship with Allo and the Dinosaucers implies they are more like rivals than enemies.
Princess Dei is an evolved Deinonychus with yellow-green skin who is Genghis Rex's older sister and the only female Tyranno. She appears a few times in episodes where the cast returns to Reptilon. It is generally believed that she is the leader of the Tyrannos' movement on Reptilon. Almost as strong as her younger brother, but more intelligent and agile, she demonstrates considerable skill in battle. She also constantly scolds her brother when things go wrong, something no other Tyranno has the courage to do. She appears less than the others due to still being partially tied with her matters at Reptilon. Her name is a reference to Princess Diana.
Ankylo, an evolved Ankylosaurus, is Genghis Rex's dimwitted, sycophantic assistant and is another member of the Tyrannos. Ankylo bears a resemblance to a warthog and exhibits porcine characteristics, often snorting when he speaks. He wears grey armor, has red skin and has a special weapon called the Anklebuster which creates a chain made out of energy, often used to disable the Dinosaucers. He is the most loyal Tyranno to Genghis Rex and constantly gives him advice about his schemes and tells him to back off about his feelings for Teryx, although in the latter case, his suggestions fall on deaf ears due to the intensity of Rex's emotions.
Quackpot is an evolved Hadrosaurus. Quackpot is the practical joker of the group, much to the ire of the other Tyrannos. Like Ankylo, Quackpot is red with white on his bill, neck and belly. He wears grey, blueish armor and goes also goes barefoot. Quackpot makes a quacking sound like a duck in comparison to his appearance, and talks like a 1920's gangster. In episode 63, Quackpot was the star of a children's television show back on Reptilon called Duckbill's Playhouse, under the stage name T.B. Duckbill. Therefore, he objects to harming children and even protects and cares for them at times.
Brachio is an evolved Brachiosaurus. Brachio is the archetypal thug of the gang and is purple. Brachio is the evil counterpart of Bronto Thunder. Physically the strongest among the Tyrannos, Brachio nevertheless follows Genghis Rex's orders to the letter and is not very bright though not at the same degree of stupidity as Bonehead.
Styraco is an evolved Styracosaurus. Styraco is the evil counterpart of Tricero. He is orange and wears yellow armor and goes barefoot. Styraco was formerly a dentist working at the office of Pinchem, Pullem & Yankem before joining Genghis Rex on Earth. He is intelligent and sometimes works with machines though not as often as Plesio. Like Ankylo, he is extremely loyal to Rex. He is sensitive to mental pressure and can behave in a deranged way when pushed to the brink of his sanity. He likes to eat, and really hates water. 
Plesio is an evolved Plesiosaurus, a prehistoric aquatic reptile. Plesio is cunning and shifty, looks like a pink dragon, and is the "evil" counterpart of Ichy. Like Ichy, Plesio can talk to sea creatures. Plesio used to work for Slither, Slither & Shark, Attorneys at Law on Reptilon before becoming a Tyranno. He once had a romantic relationship with the Loch Ness Monster. He serves as the scientist/inventor of the group. He does understand marine creatures and became obsessed in freeing some at the episode Age of Aquariums, though he only wanted to have an army of his own. Plesio seems to be most distant from Genghis Rex than the rest of the Tyrannos.
Terrible Dactyl is the flying member of the Tyrannos and the evil counterpart of Teryx. He speaks with a British accent. He wears a pilot mask, purple armor, and a white scarf and has orange skin. Terrible Dactyl is an evolved Pteranodon, a pterosaur which is commonly referred to as a Pterodactyl. In a large proportion of the episodes, Terrible Dactyl begins the conflict between the Dinosaucers and Tyrannos by observing some "suspicious" activity and reporting it to Genghis Rex. Unlike a true Pteranodon, Terrible Dactyl has teeth and a long rhamphorhynchoid - style tail. He has a soft spot for baby Pteranodon and even once helped the Dinosaucers protect some in the episode Eggs Marks the Spot, showing there is some good on this mostly evil-willed being after all. Additionally, he is of a more sporting nature than the other Tyrannos and will sometimes leave a conflict voluntarily if his side has an unfair advantage in numbers.

Minor characters
 The Dinosorcerer and Dinosorceress are the leaders of Reptilon. He is a Megalosaurus and she is a Plateosaurus, They prefer to rule at arm's length, staying out of the squabbles of the Dinosaucers and Tyrannos as parents would their children. They are very powerful, as shown in episodes where they levitate objects and heal deadly diseases. In addition, they are also Allo's uncle and aunt. They possess a "Book of Reptilonian Wisdom" which predicts the future.
Apatty Saurus is an evolved Apatosaurus and is Bronto Thunder's girlfriend on Reptilon. She is an expert swamp boater and became a partner at the Color Rep-Tiles tile shop, where Bronto Thunder once worked, sometime after Bronto left for Earth.
Major Clifton appears in a couple episodes, although it is never revealed when he and the Dinosaucers first met. He is portrayed as a U.S. Air Force officer who is trying to discover the truth about the Dinosaucers, at the expense of his reputation. He knows the Secret Scouts know about the Dinosaucers and confides in them about his theories, although the scouts do their best not to verify them. He currently is the caretaker of a large undersea creature that latched onto him the way newborn animals do when they hatch. 
The Furballs, Ugh and Grunt, are balls of fur who are equivalent to quite-intelligent pets on Reptilon.  They get into trouble more often than not in each episode in which they appear, but end up saving the day for the Dinosaucers since Tyrannos are allergic to them. They are brave and daring despite their size and seemingly frail appearance. They either have arms or legs, but not both. They're also able to talk and are afraid of ghosts.
Captain Sabretooth and Smilin'Don: Evolved Smilodon. They are space pirates with advance weapons that rivals Reptilon's, like a device that naturalizes the Dinosaucers' and Tyrannos' Fossilizers. They're part of a group called the 'Sabretooths' it is said that were invaders of Reptilon, according to the Dinosaucers, but both Captain Sabretooth and Smilin' Don seem to state that Reptilon was their home. Either way, it took all of Reptilon to get and keep the Sabretooths off the planet. They can be fended off with cat nip, a little gift Sara gives to the Dinosaucers and Tyrannos in order to keep them away afterwards.
Nessie: Known as the Loch Ness Monster, she is a female Elasmosaurus. Upon meeting Plesio, she falls in love with him and though Genghis Rex plans to turn her a member of the Tyrannos, Plesio loves her to the point of denying Rex's command and even defossilize the Dinosaucers to help free her. Even though she is offered to become a Dinosaucer, she declines. She became a close friend to Teryx due to both being females and kept her love to Plesio despite his evil roots. She is currently an ally and friend to the Dinosaucers. She debuted in the episode Lochs and Bay Gulls.
Dinosaur Dundy (Joseph Dunderback): An Australian human scientist obsessed with studying biology. He once studied the lifeforms on a swamp but changed his focus and started to study dinosaurs. Due to some radioactive material leaking while he was transporting them some of the creatures in the swamp mutated, gained intelligence (about level of Bonehead) and the ability to talk. The mutated creatures on the swamp felt his uninterest and started to behave wildly or strangely in order to draw his attention. Crocodiles, turtles and snakes are his closest friends. In the end, he resumes his original quest and becomes an ally and friend to the Dinosaucers alongside his reptilian comrades. He debuted in the episode named after him. He likes to drive watercraft in order for his reptilian friends to ski in the swamp. He is  based on Paul Hogan's movie character, Crocodile Dundee.
Turtleback and Shellhead: Two mutated Earthling turtles which are some of Dinosaur Dundy's closest friends. They have cheerful personalities and good will. Dundy refers to them as "two of the slipperies characters he has ever met". They also relate well with the Dinosaucers due to them all being reptiles. Though initially hostile and mischievous, they eventually learn the error of their ways and begin enjoying life for what is worth it. They made their debut in the episode Dinosaur Dundy. They love to ski in the swamp.
Crockpot: A mutated Earthling crocodile whom Dinosaur Dundy has cared since it was a hatchling. He became aggressive after Dinosaur Dundy forgot about him and only reverted when he gave up his obsession and returned to the passion of studying the creatures of the swamps. All he wanted was attention and notice from his old human friend after all. He began to enjoy life alongside his human and reptile friends. He was introduced to the series in the episode Dinosaur Dundy. He takes a liking to skiing since then.
Marty and Snake Eyes: Two mutated Earth snakes which are friends to Dinosaur Dundy. They are also close to the other mutated reptiles on the swamp. They are left to guard Sara by Crockpot but tag along with Sara after getting bored. They are very sympathetic, docile and friendly. They debuted in the episode Dinosaur Dundy and Sara states them to be musicians. They learn how to ski and greatly enjoy adventure.

Home video releases

U.S. releases
Dinosaucers: Dinosaur Valley & Carnivore in Rio • Released in 1994. It included the first and seventeenth episodes of the series.
Dinosaucers: Take Us Out to the Ball Game & Monday Night Clawball • Released in 1994. It included the second and thirty-second episodes of the series.
Dinosaucers: Hooray for Hollywood & Divide and Conquer • Released in 1994. It included the fourth and fifth episodes of the series.
Dinosaucers: The First Snow & Frozen Furballs • Released in 1994. It included the twelfth and eighteenth episodes of the series.

There have been four tapes in total released on VHS cassette in NTSC format specifically for the United States and Canadian markets. None are still in print or available, making these 4 VHS tapes rare. Dinosaucers has not been released on DVD and there are no known plans to do so from Sony Pictures Home Entertainment.

UK releases
Dinosaucers: Volume 1 • Released March 14, 1994. The episodes included in this volume are Dinosaur Valley, Take Us Out To The Ball Game, Happy Egg Day To You, Hooray For Hollywood and Divide And Conquer.
Dinosaucers: Volume 2 • Released October 10, 1994. The episodes included in this volume are Burgers Up!, Be Prepared, That Shrinking Feeling, Rockin' Reptiles and Sleeping Booty.

There were two tapes in total released for the UK market in PAL format. Unlike the United States released tapes that had two episodes on each tape, the United Kingdom tapes had five episodes each on both tapes released, making it superior to the North American VHS tapes, since the UK tapes contains more episodes showing.

The first 21 episodes can be purchased and downloaded online on Amazon.com as well as on iTunes.

Episodes
Stephan Martinieri directed all episodes.

Voice actors
Len Carlson: Allo/Quackpot
Rob Cowan: Tricero
Marvin Goldhar: Bonehead/Bronto Thunder
Dan Hennessey: Genghis Rex/Plesio
Ray Kahnert: Stego
Gordon Masten: Styraco
Don McManus: Brachio
Louise Vallance: Teryx, Princess Dei
Simon Reynolds: Ryan Spencer
Barbara Lynn Redpath: Sara Spencer
John Stocker: Ankylo/Terrible Dactyl/Ugh
Leslie Toth: David
Chris Wiggins: Dimetro
Thick Wilson: Ichy
Richard Yearwood: Paul
Edie Mirman

Other credits 
Executive Producers: Benjamin Melniker, Michael E. Uslan, Andy Heyward, Tom Edwards
Producer: Michael Maliani
Director: Stephan Martinière
Art Director: Pascal Morelli
Animation Directors: Masanori Miura, Norio Kashima
Creative Supervisors: Robby London, Lori Crawford
Production Supervisors: Winnie Chaffee, Bonnie Vitti
Music: Shuki Levy, Haim Saban
Story Editors: Diane Duane, Brynne Stephens, Lydia Marano
Storyboard Artists: Kent Butterworth, Adrian Gonzalez, Steve Gordon, Gordon Harrison, Jim Smith
Original Drawings: Craig Berman

See also 
 Extreme Dinosaurs

References

External links 

 

1987 American television series debuts
1987 American television series endings
1980s American daily animated television series
1980s American science fiction television series
1987 Canadian television series debuts
1987 Canadian television series endings
1980s Canadian animated television series
1980s Canadian science fiction television series
American children's animated action television series
American children's animated adventure television series
American children's animated science fiction television series
Canadian children's animated action television series
Canadian children's animated adventure television series
Canadian children's animated science fiction television series
Animated television series about dinosaurs
First-run syndicated television programs in the United States
First-run syndicated television shows in Canada
Superhero teams
English-language television shows
Television series by DIC Entertainment
Television series by Sony Pictures Television
Counter-Earths
Television series about alien visitations